Palm Canyon may refer to:

Australia
 Palm Valley (Northern Territory), formerly known as Palm Canyon.

United States
Palm Canyon (Arizona), in the Kofa National Wildlife Refuge
Palm Canyon (California), above Palm Springs, in Riverside County, California.
Borrego Palm Canyon, in Anza-Borrego Desert State Park, California 
Old Palm Canyon, in Yuma County, Arizona.
Palm Canyon Drive—California State Route 111, in the western Coachella Valley and a principal boulevard through Palm Springs, in Riverside County, California.

References